Sal Salvador (November 21, 1925 – September 22, 1999) was an American bebop jazz guitarist and a prominent music educator.

He was born in Monson, Massachusetts, United States, and began his professional career in New York City.  He eventually moved to Stamford, Connecticut.  He taught guitar at the University of Bridgeport in Bridgeport, Connecticut as well as at Western Connecticut State University in Danbury, Connecticut.  He wrote several instruction books for beginning to advanced guitarists.

In addition to recordings with Stan Kenton and with his own groups, Salvador can be heard in the film Blackboard Jungle, during a scene in a bar where a recording on which he is featured is played on the jukebox.  He is also featured playing with Sonny Stitt in the film, Jazz on a Summer's Day, at the Newport Jazz Festival.

He died in September 1999, following a fight with cancer, at the age of 73.

Discography

With Stan Kenton
Popular Favorites by Stan Kenton (Capitol, 1953)
Sketches on Standards (Capitol, 1953)
This Modern World (Capitol, 1953)
Portraits on Standards (Capitol, 1953)
The Kenton Era (Capitol, 1940–54, [1955])

References

External links
Classic Jazz Guitar

1925 births
1999 deaths
Musicians from Stamford, Connecticut
University of Bridgeport
Bebop guitarists
Western Connecticut State University people
Blue Note Records artists
20th-century guitarists